Jigjidiin Mönkhbat (1 June 1941 – 9 April 2018) was a Mongolian wrestler. At the 1968 Summer Olympics he won the silver medal in the men's Freestyle Middleweight category (87 kg), behind gold medalist Boris Michail Gurevich of the Soviet Union and ahead of bronze medalist Prodan Gardzhev of Bulgaria.
His results in the Olympics were 4 wins, 2 draws, and 0 losses. 

Mönkhbat was a Titan in Mongolian wrestling, a top rank in the sport, with six Naadam championship wins (1963–1967, 1974). He won five tournaments in a row, a feat achieved by only two other athletes in the modern history of Mongolian wrestling (since 1922). His name Mönkhbat means "Eternal firm" in the Mongolian language. 

He was the father of professional sumo wrestler Hakuhō Shō, who held the top rank of yokozuna in that sport before retiring. His son Hakuhō regards his six Nadaam championships as the equivalent of 36 tournament championships in sumo (as sumo tournaments are held six times a year) and used that as motivation to keep going even after passing Taihō's record of 32 championships.

References

External links
 

1941 births
2018 deaths
People from Töv Province
Olympic wrestlers of Mongolia
Wrestlers at the 1964 Summer Olympics
Wrestlers at the 1968 Summer Olympics
Wrestlers at the 1972 Summer Olympics
Mongolian male sport wrestlers
Olympic silver medalists for Mongolia
Olympic medalists in wrestling
Medalists at the 1968 Summer Olympics
Asian Games medalists in wrestling
Wrestlers at the 1974 Asian Games
Asian Games bronze medalists for Mongolia
World Wrestling Championships medalists
Medalists at the 1974 Asian Games
21st-century Mongolian people
20th-century Mongolian people